Lukáš Michal (born 17 August 1983) is a Czech former footballer who played as a midfielder. He played in the Czech First League for Blšany and Kladno.

References

External links

1983 births
Living people
Czech footballers
Czech Republic youth international footballers
FK Chmel Blšany players
SK Kladno players
FK Čáslav players
FK Dukla Prague players
Association football midfielders